Michael Schütz (born 12 December 1966) is a retired German football midfielder.

References

1966 births
Living people
German footballers
Fortuna Düsseldorf players
Hannover 96 players
Bundesliga players
2. Bundesliga players
Association football midfielders